The Chandanpura Masjid is a mosque situated in the old part (north) of Chittagong on the Nabab Siraj ud-Daulah road in Bangladesh. It is one of the famous landmarks in Chittagong and a popular tourist attraction for its impressive architecture consisting of multiple domes and minarets painted in bright colors. Although it was renovated in 1952, the mosque has deteriorated over the years due to environmental factors, such as air pollution. Little is known about the origin and the history behind the mosque except for the local historians.

See also
 List of mosques in Bangladesh

References

Mosques in Chittagong